This is a list of Estonian television related events from 1955.

Events
 29 June – Tallinna Televisioonistuudio (later name Estonian Television) was formed.

Debuts

Television shows

Ending this year

Births

Deaths

See also
 1955 in Estonia

References

1950s in Estonian television